Bibhutibhusan Wildlife Sanctuary (formerly Parmadan Forest) is an animal sanctuary in North 24 Parganas district in the Indian state of West Bengal. The forest is located about 100 km from Kolkata and 25 km from Bongaon.

Situated on the banks of the Ichamati River covering an area of 0.68 km2 it has more than 200 deer, birds, rabbit and many langurs. It also has a children's park, a small zoo and a tourist lodge of the forest department. The nearest bus stop is at Naldugari on the 92 bus route (Bongaon-Helencha-Duttafulia Route).

Direction 
To travel to this sanctuary, first you have to reach Bongaon by train or bus, then take a 96/C route bus and get off at Nataberia Bazaar. From there you can easily reach Bibhutibhushan Wildlife Sanctuary by Toto.

History 
The sanctuary began in 1964 when 14 chital were released in the forest. In 1980, it was named "Parmadan" when it was declared a wildlife sanctuary. In 1995 it acquired its present name after the famous Bengali author Bibhutibhushan Bandyopadhyay who was a great nature lover.

Location 
The forest is located about 100 km from Kolkata and 25 km from Bongaon.

Wildlife 
It has more than 200 deer, birds, rabbit and many langurs and Monkeys.

References

  West Bengal Wildlife Sanctuaries

External links
 
 

Wildlife sanctuaries in West Bengal
Tourist attractions in North 24 Parganas district
Protected areas established in 1980
1980 establishments in West Bengal